Albany is a luxury resort community on the island of New Providence in The Bahamas, which opened October 2010. Albany has an Els-designed 18-hole championship golf course, a luxury boutique hotel, a family water park, an adult pool, a spa and fitness center, a children's clubhouse, a variety of restaurants and bars, and a 71-slip mega-yacht marina.

Albany is named after a historic pink Bahamian colonial mansion called Albany House, which was formerly owned by French film maker Jean Chalopin, the creator of the animated television series Inspector Gadget.

Albany House also served as arch villain Dimitrios’ beachfront home in the 2006 James Bond movie Casino Royale.

Many top professional golfers are members of Albany, including Els, Woods, Tim Clark, Trevor Immelman, Ian Poulter, Adam Scott and Justin Rose. Along with golfers, Albany has many singers and actors, including: Justin Timberlake, Will Smith, and Kate Hudson. From 2021 until its collapse in 2022, FTX CEO Sam Bankman-Fried lived in a penthouse apartment in Albany with nine colleagues.

In 2018, Forbes called Albany "one of the most exclusive resorts in the world".

References

External links

 
 Conde Nast Traveler: Bahamas Real Estate, What will your dollar buy?
 The Tribune: Albany 'gunning for tight' $400m Phase I completion
 New York Times Breaking Ground: Albany & Dancing Bear Aspen
 NBC Sports: Bahamas approves resort financed by Tiger, Els

2010 establishments in the Bahamas
Gated communities
Golf clubs and courses in the Bahamas
New Providence
Resorts in the Bahamas